Luis Álvaro de Oliveira Ribeiro (December 16, 1942 – August 16, 2016), commonly known as LAOR, was a Brazilian businessman of the real estate industry. He was president of Santos FC from 2009 to 2014.

History
Born in Santos on December 16, 1942, Luis Álvaro Ribeiro de Oliveira was the Santos FC's advisor for 17 years, Luis was a presidential candidate in 2003 from the entrepreneur Marcelo Teixeira, reaching 990 votes. "My doctor and my family called me crazy for taking the candidacy, because in July 2003 I had suffered a stroke and four heart attacks. But the love for Santos spoke louder, and two months after seeing death up close I was there as a candidate", says Luís Álvaro.

Santos FC
In November 2009, in an election marked by protests, Luis won with 62% of the votes - 1882 votes, the highest quorum in club history - defeating Marcelo Teixeira, who since then had remained in the presidency of the club. His first title as Santos FC president was the 2010 Campeonato Paulista.

Luis Álvaro was the 35th president of Santos FC. One of his greatest achievements was the repatriation of the idol Robinho, signed on loan from Manchester City, England. To be successful in the negotiation, Luis Álvaro counted with the help of partners, through quotas, helped pay the salaries of the player.
After winning the 2010 Campeonato Paulista being for only five months in command of the Santos FC executive, Luis Alvaro reaches another notable achievement: leading the club to their second title in 2010, the 2010 Copa do Brasil, the first of Santos' history. Since 1968, Santos not won two titles in the same year.

Using your skill and experience in business, "Laor" contradicts all expectations and renewed for five years the contract of striker Neymar.
And in 2010, before completing one year of mandate, repatriates more an idol, one of the best players of Brazil in the 2010 FIFA World Cup, Elano. In 2011, the club won the Campeonato Paulista and the Libertadores at his command.

On 15 May, LAOR resigned from the presidency of the club due to health problems, and Odílio Rodrigues (the former vice-president) assumed the position until the end of his term.

Trophies won by club during presidency
Campeonato Paulista (3):
2010, 2011, 2012
Copa do Brasil (1):
2010
Copa Libertadores (1):
2011
Recopa Sudamericana (1):
2012

External links
Biography in Santos FC official website

References

1942 births
2016 deaths
People from Santos, São Paulo
Santos FC